Percy Mokonopi was a former General in the South African National Defence Force, and a former founding member of the African National Congress's military wing, Umkhonto weSizwe (MK).

Honours and awards

Military career
General Mokonopi joined MK at its inception in 1961, and immediately received military training in the Soviet Union, and in Cuba. During the 1962 Cuban Missile Crisis, he participated under the Cuban Armed Forces, as part of the Umkhonto weSizwe contingent. In 1964, he was briefly based at Tanzania, before moving to Zambia in preparation for external deployment. He eventually was shifted away from MK activities, and was appointed as the African National Congress's Chief Representative to Angola and Finland. He later served on the World Peace Council, at its headquarters in Helsinki. He later joined the South African National Defence Force, when MK was incorporated into it in 1994 as a Brigadier General. Mokonopi was placed on special leave with full pay in 1999, after a string of misdemeanors.

Disappearance
Mokonopi went missing in 2002, a couple of weeks after he was featured on the Documentary "Twelve Disciples of Nelson Mandela", and has never been found. He was survived by his wife, Mary, who died shortly after, and one child.

References 

South African Army generals